Ectinoderus is a genus of Asian bugs in the family Reduviidae.  It is the type genus of the tribe Ectinoderini: the 'Oriental resin bugs' (although some authorities elevate this to a subfamily - Ectinoderinae).

Determination

The two genera of Oriental resin bugs appear to be very similar to one another, but can be differentiated by careful examination of the head region.  With Ectinoderus the first antennal segment is always distinctly longer than the head, but in Amulius  this segment is much shorter (<50%) than the head length.  Species in this genus require review.

Species 
The Global Biodiversity Information Facility lists:
 Ectinoderus bipunctatus (Amyot & Serville 1843)
 Ectinoderus caedens Miller 1958
 Ectinoderus celebensis Miller 1954
 Ectinoderus certator Miller 1958
 Ectinoderus exortivus Distant 1903
 Ectinoderus longimanus Westwood 1845
 Ectinoderus nitidus Stål 1866
 Ectinoderus philippinensis Westwood 1845
 Ectinoderus ruppelli Breddin 1900
 Ectinoderus surmpluosus Distant 1903

References

External links
 
 
 Pinned specimen at Naturalista.mx Género Ectinoderus

Reduviidae
Hemiptera of Asia